The 2015 Dalian Women's Tennis Open was a professional tennis tournament played on hard courts. It was the first tournament in the 2015 WTA 125K series and took place in Dalian, China, from 8 to 13 September 2015.

Singles draw entrants

Seeds 

 1 Rankings are as of 31 August 2015.

Other entrants 
The following players received wildcards into the singles main draw:
  Lu Jiajing
  Xu Shilin
  Zhang Shuai
  Zhang Yuxuan

The following players received entry from the qualifying draw:
  Liu Chang
  Lu Jingjing
  Katarzyna Piter
  Emily Webley-Smith

Doubles draw entrants

Seeds 

 1 Rankings are as of 31 August 2015.

Other entrants 
The following players received wildcards into the singles main draw:
  Li Yixuan /  Sun Xuliu

Champions

Singles 

  Zheng Saisai def.  Julia Glushko, 2–6, 6–1, 7–5

Doubles 

  Zhang Kailin /  Zheng Saisai def.  Chan Chin-wei /  Darija Jurak, 6–3, 6–4

External links
 Tournament website at wtatennis.com

2015 WTA 125K series
2015
2015 in Chinese tennis